Robert Bragg may refer to:

 Robert Bragg (pilot), first officer on Pan Am Flight 1736, in the Tenerife airport disaster
 Robert Henry Bragg Jr. (1939–2017), American professor in the Department of Materials Science and Engineering